Begusarai Lok Sabha constituency is one of the 40 Lok Sabha (parliamentary) constituencies in Bihar state in eastern India. This constituency is stronghold of Bhumihar caste. Since independence every candidate won in this constituency comes from Bhumihar community except in 2009.( Monazir Hassan won in 2009)

Assembly segments
From the 2009 Lok Sabha elections, Begusarai Lok Sabha constituency comprises the following seven Vidhan Sabha (Legislative Assembly) segments:

Note:M.L.A of Constituency No.144 Matihani won as a candidate of LJP but later joined JD(U).

List of Members of Parliament

Source:

Election results

General Election 2019

General Election 2014

General Election 2009

See also
 Begusarai District
 List of Constituencies of the Lok Sabha

References

Lok Sabha constituencies in Bihar
Politics of Begusarai district